The Metro Manila Film Festival Award for Best Float is an award presented annually by the Metropolitan Manila Development Authority (MMDA). It was first awarded at the 18th Metro Manila Film Festival ceremony, held in 1992; Okay Ka Fairy Ko! Part 2 won the award for their float during the parade and it is given to the motion picture team that demonstrates the best float during the parade. Currently, nominees and winners are determined by Executive Committees, headed by the Metropolitan Manila Development Authority Chairman and key members of the film industry.

Winners and nominees

1990s

2000s

2010s

2020s

References

External links
IMDB: Metro Manila Film Festival
Official website of the Metro Manila Film Festival

Float